Noktor was a manufacturer of a 50mm 0.95 HyperPrime manual-focus lens for the Micro Four Thirds system. Noktor's lenses went on sale in April 2010 and were the only type of lens faster than 0.95 manufactured at the time.

References

External links
 Noktor.com
 
 Philipbloom.net Shows field photos taken with the Noktor lens.
 
 
 
 
 
 
 
 
 

Photography companies of China